Cytochrome c oxidase assembly factor 3, also known as Coiled-coil domain-containing protein 56, or Mitochondrial translation regulation assembly intermediate of cytochrome c oxidase protein of 12 kDa is a protein that in humans is encoded by the COA3 gene. This gene encodes a member of the cytochrome c oxidase assembly factor family. Studies of a related gene in fly suggest that the encoded protein is localized to mitochondria and is essential for cytochrome c oxidase function.

Structure 
The COA3 gene is located on the q arm of chromosome 17 at position 21.2 and it spans 1,107 base pairs. The COA3 gene produces a 7.8 kDa protein composed of 71 amino acids. COA3 is a component of the enzyme MITRAC (mitochondrial translation regulation assembly intermediate of cytochrome c oxidase complex) complex, and the structure contains a C-terminal coiled-coil domain as well as a central single pass transmembrane domain.

Function 
The COA3 gene encodes for a Core protein of the MITRAC (mitochondrial translation regulation assembly intermediate of cytochrome c oxidase complex) complex. The MITRAC complex is essential in the assembly of cytochrome c oxidase (complex IV) of the mitochondrial respiratory chain, which is responsible for the catalysis of oxidation of cytochrome c by molecular oxygen. The MITRAC complex regulates both translation of mitochondrial encoded components and assembly of nuclear-encoded components imported in mitochondrion. In addition, COA3 is required for efficient translation of MT-CO1 and assembly of the mitochondrial respiratory chain complex IV.

Clinical significance
Variants of COA3 have been associated with the mitochondrial Complex IV deficiency, a deficiency in an enzyme complex of the mitochondrial respiratory chain which catalyzes the oxidation of cytochrome c utilizing molecular oxygen. The deficiency is characterized by heterogeneous phenotypes ranging from isolated myopathy to severe multisystem disease affecting several tissues and organs. Other Clinical Manifestations include hypertrophic cardiomyopathy, hepatomegaly and liver dysfunction, hypotonia, muscle weakness, exercise intolerance, developmental delay, delayed motor development and mental retardation. A missense mutation of c.215A>G in the COA3 gene has been found to result in a severe decrease in protein levels with symptoms of exercise intolerance and peripheral neuropathy.

Interactions 

Like COX14, COA3 is a key component of the MITRAC (mitochondrial translation regulation assembly intermediate of cytochrome c oxidase complex) complex. In addition, it has interactions with proteins such as MT-CO1, COX1, SMIM20, SURF1, TIMM21, and others.

References

Further reading